Margaret Douglas, Countess of Douglas (died c. 1474), known as the Fair Maid of Galloway, was a Scottish noblewoman, and a member of the Black Douglas family towards the end of the family's position as a major power in Scotland.

She was the daughter of Archibald Douglas, 5th Earl of Douglas, and Eupheme Graham, daughter of Patrick Graham, Earl of Strathearn and Euphemia Stewart, Countess of Strathearn.

She acquired Galloway when her two brothers (one of whom was William Douglas, 6th Earl of Douglas) were murdered at the Black Dinner in Edinburgh Castle.

She married her cousin William Douglas, 8th Earl of Douglas.  When he was assassinated she obtained permission to marry his brother, James Douglas, 9th Earl of Douglas, but it is not entirely clear that the marriage ever happened; if it did it must have ended in divorce, since they both married again. She then married John Stewart, 1st Earl of Atholl.

She had no children by the Earls of Douglas, but two daughters by the Earl of Atholl. These were Janet, wife of Alexander Gordon, 3rd Earl of Huntly; and Elizabeth, wife of Andrew Gray, 2nd Lord Gray. Both had issue.

Margaret Douglas in fiction 
She is a significant character in Black Douglas by Nigel Tranter, which is rather speculative about her relationship with the 8th and 9th Earls of Douglas.

She is the protagonist and fictional author of Maid Margaret, a 1905 novel by Samuel Rutherford Crockett and also appears as an important character in his earlier novel The Black Douglas (1899).

References

Margaret
Scottish countesses
Daughters of Scottish earls
1470s deaths
Year of birth unknown
15th-century Scottish people
15th-century Scottish women
Lords of Galloway